A sports prototype, sometimes referred to as simply a prototype, is a type of race car that is used in the highest-level categories of sports car racing.  These purpose-built racing cars, unlike street-legal and production-based racing cars, are not intended for consumer purchase or production beyond that required to compete and win races.

Prototype racing cars have competed in sports car racing since before World War II, but became the top echelon of sports cars in the 1960s as they began to replace homologated sports cars.  Current ACO regulations allow most sports car series to use two forms of cars: grand tourers (GT), based on street cars, and prototypes, which are allowed a great amount of flexibility within set rule parameters.

In historic racing, they are often called "sports racing cars". Sometimes, they are incorrectly referred to as "Le Mans cars", whether they are competing in the Le Mans race or not.

Types of sports prototypes
Since the 1960s, various championships have allowed prototypes to compete.  However, most championships have had their own set of rules for their prototype classes.  Listed here are some of the more commonly known types of prototypes.

 Group 7
 Group 6
 Group C
 Group CN
 Grand Touring Prototype (GTP)
 Le Mans Prototype (LMP)
 Le Mans Prototype Challenge (LMPC)
 Le Mans Hypercar (LMH)
 Daytona Prototype (DP)
 Daytona Prototype International (DPi)
 Le Mans Daytona h (LMDh)
 Sports 2000

References

External links

 
Sports car racing